New York wine refers to wine made from grapes grown in the U.S. state of New York. New York ranks third in grape production by volume after California and Washington. 83% of New York's grape area is Vitis labrusca varieties (mostly Concord). The rest is split almost equally between Vitis vinifera and French hybrids.

History

The state of New York's wine production began in the 17th century with Dutch and Huguenot plantings in the Hudson Valley region. Commercial production did not begin until the 19th century. New York is home to the first bonded winery in the United States of America, Pleasant Valley Wine Company, located in Hammondsport. It is also home to America's oldest continuously operating winery, Brotherhood Winery in the Hudson Valley, which has been making wine for almost 175 years.

In 1951 Konstantin Frank emigrated from Ukraine to New York, to work at Cornell University's Geneva Experiment Station. Frank went on to become one of the major architects of modern Finger Lakes winemaking industry.

In 1976, when the Farm Winery Act was passed in New York, the state had only 19 wineries, all located in the Finger Lakes and Long Island regions. By 1985, there were 63 wineries in the two regions. 

In 2011, the New York wineries were given another boost when Governor Andrew Cuomo signed the Fine Winery Law (S.4143-a/A.7828-a) into law, allowing each farm winery to operate up to 5 tasting rooms as a single entity, rather than requiring a separate license for each. The act also streamlined the paperwork involved in direct shipping wine to customers, and allowed wineries to use custom-crush facilities or rent equipment and space from existing wineries, rather than requiring wineries to own all their equipment.

Wine grapes

The Vitis vinifera varieties account for less than 10% of the wine produced in New York. Important American hybrid grapes grown in New York include Catawba, Delaware, Niagara, Elvira, Ives and Isabella. French hybrid grapes grown in New York include Aurore, Baco noir, De Chaunac, Seyval blanc, Cayuga, Vidal and Vignoles. Vignoles is particularly used in late harvest wines and ice wines. Of the Vitis vinifera varieties, Riesling is noted for the most consistent and best quality wines, while wine made from Chardonnay grown in the Finger Lakes AVA is noted to take on characteristics of leaner styled Burgundy white wine.

Growing regions
The state's principal winemaking regions are the Finger Lakes and Long Island. The Finger Lakes wine region developed in the 19th century; the first commercial vineyard and winery on Long Island was established in 1973.

New York has a total of eleven designated American Viticultural Areas: Champlain Valley AVA, Long Island AVA, North Fork of Long Island AVA, The Hamptons, Long Island AVA; Hudson River Region AVA; Finger Lakes AVA, Seneca Lake AVA, Cayuga Lake AVA; Niagara Escarpment AVA, Upper Hudson AVA and Lake Erie AVA.

The wine regions' soils originated from the last glacial advance which left gravel and shale type soils with heavy clay deposits in the Finger Lakes region and sandy soil in the Long Island region. The climate differs amongst the regions based on the Atlantic Gulf Stream and the numerous bodies of water and mountainous regions around the state. The growing season in the Lake Erie and Finger Lakes regions ranges from 180 to 200 days a year, while on Long Island, the season extends to 220 days and the humidity is higher, and the fall precipitation is somewhat higher as well.

Statewide, there were 470 wineries in New York in 2019.

The Adirondack Coast Wine Trail, established in 2014, includes seven small vineyards/wineries (under 15 acres), including one combined apple winery and cider house, along the Adirondack Coast in northeastern New York, between Mooers and Morrisonville.

Cultivation, production, and economic impact
A report in 2020, commissioned by the New York Wine & Grape Foundation, estimated that in the preceding year, 35,000 acres in New York states are used for wine cultivation, of which 11,000 acres are for wine grapes, and most of the rest are for juice grapes. The report estimated that in 2019, the state produced approximately 57,000 tons of wine grapes valued at $37.28 million (compared to approximately 128,000 tons of juice grapes valued at $28.80 million). The report estimated that the state's wine and grape industry generated a total in $2.4 billion in federal, state, and local taxes, including business, excise, and sales taxes.

A 2017 report commissioned by the New York Wine & Grape Foundation estimated that the New York wine industry supported 62,000 direct jobs paying $2.4 billion in wages. About 37% of New York produced wine was sold through wholesalers; the rest was sold by wineries in their tasting rooms, or distributed by wineries to restaurants and shops in the state.

References

Further reading

External links
Survey of Finger Lakes Rieslings 
Cornell University Viticulture and Enology Program
New York Wine/Grape Foundation, a New York State public-benefit corporation

Wine regions of the United States by state